Milk-Bone is a brand of dog biscuit. It was created in 1908 by the F.H. Bennett Biscuit Company, which operated a bakery on the Lower East Side of New York City. Originally named "Maltoid", the biscuit was a bone-shaped treat made from minerals, meat products, and milk. The biscuits are made exclusively in Buffalo, New York.

History 
Sometime between 1915 and 1926, the biscuit was simply named "Milk-Bone", owing to the high composition of cow's milk. In 1931, the bakery was acquired by the National Biscuit Company (now Nabisco). The biscuit was the only Bennett product carried over after the acquisition.

Over the next few decades, the Milk-Bone was expanded to include a number of different flavors, such as chicken and beef. The marketing focus was also shifted from Milk-Bone being merely a dog treat to a product that promoted cleaner teeth and better breath. Nabisco, under the ownership of Kraft Foods, sold the Milk-Bone rights to Del Monte Foods in May 2006.

Del Monte Foods renamed their pet products division Big Heart Pet Brands. This division was spun off in 2014 to create "Del Monte Pacific Limited".

On February 3, 2015, The J.M. Smucker Company announced the acquisition of Big Heart Pet Brands.

A box of Milk-Bone treats makes an early product placement appearance in the 1924 silent film The Tomboy, and this product was the basis for a line from the TV sitcom Cheers, spoken by George Wendt's character Norm: "It's a dog-eat-dog world and I'm wearing Milk-Bone underwear."

A box of Milk-Bone Biscuits can be seen, in cartoon form, in Mickey's Surprise Party (1939), a theatrical advertisement/cartoon short produced by Walt Disney Productions for Nabisco. Pluto is seen presenting Minnie's dog Fifi with a box of Milk-Bone Biscuits; she happily accepts them and thanks Pluto by kissing him.

Notes

External links
 

Dog food brands
Del Monte Foods brands
Nabisco brands
Products introduced in 1908
The J.M. Smucker Co. brands
1908 establishments in the United States